Michael Knight is the name of:

Michael E. Knight (born 1959), American actor known for work in daytime soap operas
Michael Knight (Australian politician) (born 1952), Australian former politician
Michael Knight (Knight Rider), the fictional main character of Knight Rider, a popular U.S. television show from the 1980s
Michael Muhammad Knight (born 1977), American novelist and journalist
Michael Knight (writer), American writer of fiction
Michael Knight (RAF officer) (1932–2022), British air marshal
Michael T. Knight (1832–1916), official and politician in Newfoundland

See also
Mychael Knight (1978–2017), contestant on the reality television show Project Runway
Mickey Knight (born 1959), American pornographic actor
Michael McKnight, a musician and lead singer of Soulidium